Colin Anderson may refer to:
 Colin Anderson (footballer) (born 1962), English footballer
 Colin Anderson (sport shooter) (born 1912), Australian sports shooter
 Colin Anderson (American football) (born 1989), American football tight end
 Colin Anderson (rugby league), English rugby league footballer of the 1950s
 Sir Colin Anderson (shipowner), British art collector and benefactor, chairman of the committee which produced the 1960 Anderson Report